Hawke's Bay is a local government region on the east coast of New Zealand's North Island. The region's name derives from Hawke Bay, which was named by Captain James Cook in honour of Admiral Edward Hawke. The region is governed by Hawke's Bay Regional Council.

Geography 

The region is situated on the east coast of the North Island. It bears the former name of what is now Hawke Bay, a large semi-circular bay that extends for 100 kilometres from northeast to southwest from Māhia Peninsula to Cape Kidnappers.

The Hawke's Bay Region includes the hilly coastal land around the northern and central bay, the floodplains of the Wairoa River in the north, the wide fertile Heretaunga Plains around Hastings in the south, and a hilly interior stretching up into the Kaweka and Ruahine Ranges. The prominent peak Taraponui is located inland.

Five major rivers flow to the Hawke's Bay coast. From north to south, they are the Wairoa River, Mohaka River, Tutaekuri River, Ngaruroro River and Tukituki River. Lake Waikaremoana, situated in northern Hawke's Bay, roughly 35 km from the coast, is the largest lake in Hawke's Bay, the fourth largest in the North Island and the 16th largest in New Zealand.

The regional council area consists of the territorial authorities of Wairoa District, Hastings District, Napier City, and its southernmost district, Central Hawke's Bay District, plus the localities of Taharua in the Taupo District and Ngamatea in the Rangitikei District. It does not include the Tararua District,  Dannevirke, Woodville or Norsewood, which have been under the Manawatū-Whanganui Regional Council (also known as Horizons Regional Council) since the 1989 local government reforms. In June 2015, the Local Government Commission proposed the amalgamation of the four territorial authorities in the region with the Hawke's Bay Regional Council, but this was rejected in a poll of residents.

The region has a hill with the longest place name in New Zealand, and the longest in the world according to the 2009 Guinness Book of Records. Taumata­whakatangihanga­koauau­o­tamatea­turi­pukakapiki­maunga­horo­nuku­pokai­whenua­kitanatahu is an otherwise unremarkable hill in southern Hawke's Bay, not far from Waipukurau.

Demography 
Around  percent of the region's population lives in the Napier-Hastings conurbation.

Hawke's Bay Region had a population of 166,368 at the 2018 New Zealand census, an increase of 15,189 people (10.0%) since the 2013 census, and an increase of 18,585 people (12.6%) since the 2006 census. There were 60,237 households. There were 81,054 males and 85,314 females, giving a sex ratio of 0.95 males per female. The median age was 40.6 years (compared with 37.4 years nationally), with 34,935 people (21.0%) aged under 15 years, 29,202 (17.6%) aged 15 to 29, 71,841 (43.2%) aged 30 to 64, and 30,390 (18.3%) aged 65 or older.

Of those at least 15 years old, 21,417 (16.3%) people had a bachelor or higher degree, and 27,633 (21.0%) people had no formal qualifications. The median income was $28,300, compared with $31,800 nationally. 16,485 people (12.5%) earned over $70,000 compared to 17.2% nationally. The employment status of those at least 15 was that 63,999 (48.7%) people were employed full-time, 19,605 (14.9%) were part-time, and 4,710 (3.6%) were unemployed.

Below is a list of urban areas that contain more than 1,000 population.

Other towns and settlements in Hawke's Bay include:

 Tuai
 Frasertown
 Nūhaka
 Mahia Beach
 Whirinaki
 Whakatu
 Haumoana
 Te Awanga
 Waimārama
 Tikokino
 Ongaonga
 Takapau
 Ōtāne
 Porangahau

Culture and identity

Ethnicities in the 2018 census were 75.0% European/Pākehā, 27.0% Māori, 5.6% Pacific peoples, 5.0% Asian, and 1.7% other ethnicities. People may identify with more than one ethnicity.

The percentage of people born overseas was 15.9, compared with 27.1% nationally.

Although some people objected to giving their religion, 48.5% had no religion, 37.4% were Christian, 0.7% were Hindu, 0.4% were Muslim, 0.6% were Buddhist and 5.5% had other religions.

The major local Māori tribe is Ngāti Kahungunu.

History 

Bay whaling stations operated on the shores of the bay in the nineteenth century.

Hawke's Bay Province was founded in 1858 as a province of New Zealand, after being separated from the Wellington Province following a meeting in Napier in February 1858. The Province was abolished in 1876 along with all other provinces in New Zealand. It was replaced with a Provincial District.

On February 3, 1931, Napier and Hastings were devastated by New Zealand's worst natural disaster, an earthquake measuring 7.9 on the Richter magnitude scale, which killed 256 people. Napier rebuilt and now the city is world-famous for its Art Deco buildings, and celebrates its heritage each February with the Art Deco Weekend. MTG Hawke's Bay, formerly Hawke's Bay Museum and Art Gallery, has an exhibition on the earthquake, its causes and impact.

On the 13th and 14th of February, 2023, Cyclone Gabrielle caused extensive damage in Hawke's Bay as it passed over the North Island. Power, phone service and internet access was cut to over 16,000 properties when the main Redcliffe substation was damaged in floodwaters after the Tutaekuri River burst its banks. Downstream, 1,000 people were evacuated from low lying plains surrounding the river, where significant parts of Taradale, Meeanee and Awatoto were submerged. The floodwaters destroyed 4 bridges, including Redcliffe Bridge, a major crossing just south of Taradale. SH2 and SH51 bridges were heavily damaged, but did not collapse. A span of the Palmerston North-Gisborne Line crossing the Tutaekuri River also collapsed. The Ngaruroro River also breached its banks, flooding the town of Omahu where 20 people required evacuation via helicopter. In Wairoa, the Wairoa River breached its banks, flooding approximately 15 percent of the town. Access to Wairoa was cut off after extensive damage on SH2's Mohaka River Bridge in the south, and landslides also closing SH2 to the north. Water supply in Central Hawke's Bay failed, and a mandatory evacuation was ordered for eastern Waipawa after the Waipara river rose to record levels. The total cost and damages are unknown at this time.

Economy 

The subnational gross domestic product (GDP) of Hawke's Bay was estimated at NZ$8.67 billion in the year to March 2019, 2.9% of New Zealand's national GDP. The regional GDP per capita was estimated at $50,251 in the same period. In the year to March 2018, primary industries contributed $1.14 billion (13.9%) to the regional GDP, goods-producing industries contributed $1.84 billion (22.3%), service industries contributed $4.56 billion (55.3%), and taxes and duties contributed $707 million (8.6%).

Agriculture 
The region is renowned for its horticulture, with large orchards and vineyards on the plains. In the hilly parts of the region sheep and cattle farming predominates, with forestry blocks in the roughest areas.

Hawke's Bay has  of horticultural land, the third largest area in New Zealand behind Canterbury and Marlborough. The largest crops by land area are apples (4,750 ha), wine grapes (3,620 ha), squash (3,390 ha), and peas and beans (1,360 ha).

Wine 

The climate is dry and temperate, and the long, hot summers and cool winters offer excellent weather for growing grapes. Missionaries in the mid 19th century planted the first vines in Hawke's Bay and it is now an important place for full bodied red wines.

Aerospace 

Hawke's Bay is home to Rocket Lab's Launch Complex 1, New Zealand's first orbital launch site, on Māhia Peninsula. Wairoa District is home to Space Coast New Zealand, a stretch of coastline from which space launches can be viewed. Rocket Lab launches its Electron rockets several times a year, after its first successful launch of Humanity Star in January 2018.

Seismicity 

Hawke's Bay is one of the most seismically active regions in New Zealand and has experienced many large and often damaging earthquakes. More than 50 damaging earthquakes have been recorded in the region since the 1800s.

Regional council 

The region is governed by Hawke's Bay Regional Council, which has its main office and council chamber in Napier. The council consists of eleven elected members and holds elections every three years. As of 26 October 2022 the councillors are:

Proposal for a unitary authority 
Between 2013 and 2015 the Local Government Commission considered amalgamating Hawke's Bay Regional Council, its four constituent territorial authorities (Napier City Council, Central Hawke's Bay District Council, Hastings District Council and Wairoa District Council), and the small parts of the Rangitikei District Council (the rural community of Ngamahanga) and Taupo District Council (the rural community of Taharua) that fall within the Hawke's Bay Region into a unitary authority that would hold all local decision-making powers for the region. This proposal was initiated by an application from a group called "A Better Hawke's Bay" and followed the Government-led amalgamation of eight local authorities into the new Auckland Council in 2010 and a 2012 "prosperity study" that found a similar amalgamation in Hawke's Bay could save up to $25m per year. A previous proposal to merge Napier and Hastings, though supported by Hastings residents, was defeated in a public referendum in 1999.

The Local Government Commission released an initial proposal in November 2013. After taking public submissions on the proposal, the Commission issued a final proposal in June 2015. The final proposal was that Hawke's Bay would be governed by a unitary council comprising a governing body (one mayor elected at-large and eighteen councillors elected across five wards) with subsidiary decision-making made by five local boards (each with six to nine elected members).

Under the Local Government Act, the public had the right to demand a binding referendum on whether the amalgamation should proceed; such a demand would be valid if it was signed by at least 10% of the affected electors in one of the affected districts. Two days after the final proposal was issued, a valid referendum demand signed by more than 10% of the affected electors in the Rangitikei district was received (there were only twelve affected electors in that district, therefore only two signatures were required to trigger the poll). The referendum was held by post. Voting concluded on Tuesday 15 September 2015. Because 66% of electors opposed the change, the proposal was defeated and did not progress further. Results broken down to the council level showed that only Hastings district electors favoured amalgamation (52% in favour). Napier (84% opposed), Wairoa District (88% opposed) and Central Hawke's Bay (58%) were opposed. Only four votes were returned from Rangitikei (two each way); no votes were returned from Taupo district.

Culture 

The region is served by a variety of radio stations including Radio Kahungunu, The Hits 89.5, More FM, access station Radio Kidnappers and local station Bay FM. As well, most of the national commercial and non-commercial operators have transmitters covering the region. Hawke's Bay also has its own TV station, TVHB, which provides a mix of news and information programmes hosted by local personalities.

The Hawke's Bay wine region produces some of New Zealand's finest wines, celebrated together with local cuisine twice a year with the Food And Wine Classic festivals. These take place over several weekends in winter and ten days in summer, attracting thousands of visitors, many from overseas.

Napier is home to the Mission Concert held early each year since 1993. The event, held at the Mission Estate Winery in Taradale, has attracted performers such as Kenny Rogers, Elton John, Shirley Bassey, Rod Stewart, The B-52's, Belinda Carlisle, Ray Charles, and Eric Clapton. The 2009 concert attraction was to be Lionel Richie, but the concert was cancelled because of rain.

UK music artist Tycho Jones was staying in Hastings, Hawkes Bay when he was inspired to write the track Don't Be Afraid, produced by Jonathan Quarmby.

Sport 
The Hawke's Bay Rugby Union's representative team, the Magpies, plays in New Zealand's annual professional domestic rugby union competition, the Mitre 10 Cup. The team represents the Hawke's Bay Region in provincial representative rugby, and draws its players from the constituent clubs who are affiliated to the provincial union. The team play their home matches in McLean Park in Napier. Players representing Hawke's Bay are also eligible to play for the Hurricanes in the annual transnational Super Rugby competition. Hawke's Bay has produced a number of All Blacks.

The Hawke's Bay Hawks compete in the New Zealand National Basketball League.

References

External links 

 Hawke's Bay Regional Council
 Official Hawke's Bay Tourism Portal
 Official Newcomers website - free information service for newcomers to Hawke's Bay
 "Hawke's Bay Province and Provincial District". An Encyclopaedia of New Zealand, edited by A. H. McLintock, Wellington, 1966

 
Whaling stations in New Zealand